The 2014 FA Women's Cup Final was the 44th final of the FA Women's Cup, England's primary cup competition for women's football teams. The showpiece event was the 21st to be played directly under the auspices of the Football Association (FA). The final was contested between Arsenal Ladies and Everton Ladies on 1 June 2014 at stadium:mk in Milton Keynes. Holders Arsenal made its 14th final appearance, after winning the 2013 final. Everton was appearing in its fifth final.

As FA WSL 1 clubs, both teams entered the competition at the fifth round stage. Arsenal beat Gillingham (2–0), Birmingham City (2–1) and Chelsea (5–3) to reach the final. Everton defeated Cardiff City (3–1), Liverpool (2–0) and Notts County (2–1).

The victory gave Arsenal a rare FA Cup double with the men's team winning the final two weeks before.

Details

References

External links
 The FA Women's Cup

Cup
Women's FA Cup finals
Women's FA Cup final
FA Women's Cup Final, 2014
FA Women's Cup Final, 2014